The 1970 Michigan State Spartans football team represented Michigan State University in the 1970 Big Ten Conference football season. In their 17th season under head coach Duffy Daugherty, the Spartans compiled a 3–6 overall record (3–4 against Big Ten opponents) and finished in a tie for fifth place in the Big Ten Conference.

No Spartans were selected as first-team players on the 1970 All-Big Ten Conference football teams, though three received second-team honors from either the Associated Press (AP) or the United Press International (UPI): split end Gordon Bowdell (AP-2, UPI-2); guard Joe DeLamielleure (AP-2); and halfback Eric Allen (UPI-2).

Schedule

Roster

References

Michigan State
Michigan State Spartans football seasons
Michigan State Spartans football